ISO 19011 is an international standard that sets forth guidelines for management systems auditing. The current version is ISO 19011:2018.
It is developed by the International Organization for Standardization.

Originally it was published in 1990 as ISO 10011-1 and in 2002 took the current ISO 19011 numbering.

The standard offers four resources to organizations to "save time, effort and money":
 A clear explanation of the principles of management systems auditing.
 Guidance on the management of audit programs.
 Guidance on the conduct of internal or external audits.
 Advice on the competence and evaluation of auditors.

History

See also
 ISO 9001
 ISO 14001
 ISO/IEC 27001
 ISO 45001

References

External links
 ISO
 ASQ

19011